Kyung Sup Kwak is a South Korean electrical engineer, a professor in the Graduate School of Information Technology and Telecommunication at Inha University, South Korea.

Kwak did his undergraduate studies at Inha University, earning a bachelor's degree in electrical engineering in 1977. He received a master's degree from the University of Southern California in 1981, and a Ph.D. from the University of California, San Diego in 1988. He was president of the Korean Institute of Communication Sciences in 2006.

References

Year of birth missing (living people)
Living people
University of Southern California alumni
University of California, San Diego alumni
Academic staff of Inha University
South Korean expatriates in the United States